Al Jazira Club is an Emirati professional football club based in Abu Dhabi, that currently competes in the UAE Pro League.

History
Al-Jazira was established in 1974 as a merger between Khalidiyah and Al Bateen. The club struggled to stay in the league, getting relegated on multiple occasions during the 1980s and 1990s, but experienced a recent success when Mansour bin Zayed Al Nahyan invested into the club in the 2000s. Since his purchase, they won their first league title in 2011 and two more league titles in 2017 and 2021. Al Jazira have produced talented homegrown players such as Ali Mabkhout and Khalfan Mubarak and many others that would end up playing for the UAE national team.

Honours

Domestic competitions
Leagues
UAE Pro League: 3
Champion: 2010–11, 2016–17, 2020–21
UAE Division One: 2
Champion: 1982–83, 1987–88
Cups
UAE President's Cup: 3
Champion: 2010–11, 2011–12, 2015–16
UAE League Cup: 1
Champion: 2009–10
UAE Federation Cup: 1 (defunct)
Champion: 2006–07
UAE Super Cup: 1
Champion: 2021
Regional competitions
GCC Champions League: 1
Champion: 2007

Club officials

Current squad
As of UAE Pro-League:

Unregistered players

Out on loan

Managers

Pro-League record

Notes 2019–20 UAE football season was cancelled due to the COVID-19 pandemic in the United Arab Emirates.

Key
 Pos. = Position
 Tms. = Number of teams
 Lvl. = League

References

External links
Current squad at National Football Teams
Official site 

 
Jazira
Association football clubs established in 1974
Sport in Abu Dhabi
1974 establishments in the United Arab Emirates